Terkos Dam is a lake-dam near the village of Durusu in the Çatalca district of Istanbul, Turkey. The development of the project on Lake Durusu (ancient name Terkos) was realised by the Turkish State Hydraulic Works, and entered into service in 1971. It is the traditional water supply of the European part of Istanbul.

See also
List of dams and reservoirs in Turkey

References
DSI directory, State Hydraulic Works (Turkey), Retrieved December 16, 2009

Dams in Istanbul Province